Hero and the Terror is a 1988 American action film starring martial arts star Chuck Norris, directed by William Tannen. Produced by Menahem Golan, written by Michael Blodgett, and was distributed by Cannon Films. The film stars Norris as Danny O'Brien as a cop trying to stop a serial killer, Simon Moon known as "The Terror".

It is based on Michael Blodgett's 1982 novel of the same name.

Plot
Danny O'Brien is a cop who likes to work alone and never waits for his back up. In Los Angeles, O'Brien is trying to apprehend the notorious Simon Moon, also known as The Terror. Simon has been killing women by snapping their necks and taking them to his lair in an abandoned amusement park. O'Brien is attacked by Simon who almost kills him in the struggle. When the killer flees the scene and climbs up a ladder he slips and falls, knocking himself unconscious. When the backup arrives, they think O'Brien caught The Terror and the people of L.A. call him "Hero". Simon is then arrested and taken to jail.

When Dr. Highwater goes to visit Simon, he escapes by cutting through the bars of his cell. He then steals a laundry van by push starting it but loses control and falls straight down into a cliff face. When the media hears about this, they pronounce Simon dead and the people of L.A. are relieved.

Three years later the murders start back up again, O'Brien thinks it is The Terror. He eventually finds his lair in a movie theater and heads in to confront Simon himself. He encounters an enclosed room not on the map and heads in. In there he finds the bodies of The Terror's victims and starts searching around for him. Simon jumps out and attacks him and Danny tries to fight him off. O'Brien eventually kills The Terror and the film ends, as he marries his girlfriend who gave birth to their daughter.

Cast

Chuck Norris as Detective Danny O'Brien
Brynn Thayer as Kay
Steve James as Robinson
Jack O'Halloran as Simon Moon
Jeffrey Kramer as Dwight
Ron O'Neal as Mayor
Murphy Dunne as Theater Manager
Heather Blodgett as Betsy
Tony DiBenedetto as Dobeny
Billy Drago as Dr. Highwater
Joe Guzaldo as Copelli
Peter Miller as Chief Bridges
Karen Witter as Ginger
Lorry Goldman as Ginger's Manager
Christine Wagner as Doctor

Production
Hero and the Terror was Chuck Norris's first major attempt at diversifying from his traditional martial arts roles.

"The success of the film is contingent on how reviewers, the media and the audience take to it. That determines everything in this business", Norris said. "I like the character of Danny O'Brien and I like the relationships I had in the film, especially with Kay (played by Brynn Thayer). I liked seeing not just the man in the arena or the fighting machine you see in many of my films, but to see the man outside the arena -- the guy who also has relationships".

"I don't want people to think I'm just going to kick butt. There's a lot more here," said Norris. "What makes this a different film is the vulnerability of the character I play. There are moments of humor, romance and compassion, and there are moments of terror, anguish and anxiety." A scene was filmed as a joke where Norris hyperventilates in the hospital and faints seeing a baby being born. The director, William Tannen, convinced Norris to test the film with the segment intact. "We did leave it in. And you know, women absolutely love that scene," he said.

"O'Brien is a guy who must face his fear, even though he feels secure in his abilities as a police officer," Norris said. "He doesn't even wait for his backup unit and goes after the killer alone. Chuck Norris fans will see the intense, focused sort of man, sure; also, I hope they will identify with the other side of his character, the multiple side...I trained really hard for this film. Jack and I did all our own fighting, and he's really strong. I threw everything short of the kitchen sink at him and every type of kick imaginable. People will believe that O'Brien really is facing a demon."

Release

Theatrical
The film premiered on August 26, 1988 in the United States.

Home media
It was released on Blu-ray for the first time in June 2015, by Kino Lorber.

Reception

Box office
Hero and the Terror grossed $1.84 million nationwide in its first weekend at the box office, finishing in 12th place for that weekend. The film made just $6 million overall.

Critical response
The movie had a mostly negative reception and has a 0% rating on movie rating website Rotten Tomatoes.

Kevin Thomas of the Los Angeles Times said, "With 'Hero and the Terror' Chuck Norris makes his most determined effort yet to balance his martial arts displays with serious acting. On a modest level Norris succeeds, only to be tripped up by an underdeveloped script". Richard Harrington of The Washington Post called the film "a typically slow and uninspired go-round", adding "it probably won't do any good, but here goes: Be very careful and avoid this 'Hero'". Roger Ebert of the Chicago Sun-Times awarded the film two out of four stars, remarking that "A new Chuck Norris is unveiled in 'Hero and the Terror', which contains its share of martial arts combat, to be sure, but also shows him as a sensitive romantic who makes small talk over candlelit dinners and wants to be present for the birth of his daughter. There is nothing in the basic story of 'Hero and the Terror' that really requires Norris to reveal these tender new aspects to his character, but perhaps he simply put them in because he liked them. Norris is a gentle and intelligent man, and maybe he grew tired of kicking people in the face in the movies".

See also
List of American films of 1988
Chuck Norris filmography

References

External links

1988 action films
1980s serial killer films
American action films
American serial killer films
Fictional portrayals of the Los Angeles Police Department
Films based on American novels
Films directed by William Tannen (director)
Films scored by David Michael Frank
Films set in Los Angeles
Films set in a movie theatre
Films shot in Los Angeles
Golan-Globus films
1980s English-language films
1980s American films